Summoning the Spirits is an 1899 French short silent film by Georges Méliès.

Plot
A magician hangs a wreath in the air and makes a grotesque face appear inside it. He then replaces it with a woman's face, and finally with a copy of his own face.

Release and survival
Méliès himself plays the magician in the film. Summoning the Spirits was sold by Méliès's Star Film Company and is numbered 205 in its catalogues, where it was advertised as a scène à transformations.

Méliès burned all the surviving original camera negatives of his films toward the end of his life, and about three-fifths of his output is presumed lost. Summoning the Spirits was among the lost films until 2007, when a copy was identified and restored by the Filmoteca de Catalunya.

References

External links
 
Summoning the Spirits on YouTube

French black-and-white films
Films directed by Georges Méliès
French silent short films
1899 short films
1890s French films
Films about magic and magicians